Diadegma defectivum is a wasp first described by Kokujev in 1915.
No subspecies are listed.

References

defectivum
Insects described in 1915